Sitodiplosis mosellana, the wheat midge or orange wheat blossom midge, is a species of fly in the family Cecidomyiidae. It is found in the  Holarctic, where it is a significant pest of wheat, triticale and rye.

References

External links
Images representing  Cecidomyiidae at BOLD

Cecidomyiidae
Insects described in 1857
Nematoceran flies of Europe